Buchholz in der Nordheide (Northern Low Saxon: Bookholt) is the largest town in the district of Harburg, in Lower Saxony, Germany. It is situated approximately 25 km southwest of Hamburg.

Geography

Buchholz is home to the Brunsberg, at 129m the highest mountain in the region. It is on the northern edge of the Lüneburg Heath (Lüneburger Heide), hence the suffix to the name.

History
In 1958, Buchholz received its city charter.

In 1992, Buchholz was struck by a small tornado which destroyed many trees and damaged numerous houses. In 2002, the temperature in Buchholz rose above 38 degrees celsius, marking an all-time high for its region.

In 2006, Buchholz tried to set a new world record by placing a crowd of 2000 people in the form of a large heart near the local swimming pool. The attempt ultimately failed because 39 people did not show up.

Division of the town
The districts of Steinbeck, Dibbersen, Seppensen, Holm-Seppensen, Sprötze and Trelde belong to Buchholz.

Districts sort by population:
 Buchholz (nucleated  town)
 District Reindorf
 District Vaensen
 District Buensen
 Holm-Seppensen
 District Seppensen
 District Holm-Seppensen
 District Holm
 Steinbeck
 District Steinbeck
 District Meilsen
 Sprötze
 Trelde
 District Trelde
 District Suerhop
 Dibbersen
 District Dibbersen
 District Dangersen

Number of inhabitants
1821 – 178
1871 – 350
1905 – 1,220
1925 – 2,138
1939 – 3,110
1945 – ca. 5,000
1946 – 6,003
1958 – 7,523
1963 – 10,364
1968 – 13,590
1972 – 15,273
After incorporations:
1972 – 22,620
1975 – 26,393
1998 – 35,264
1999 – 35,603
2000 – 35,916
2002 – 36,483
2004 – 38,556
2006 - 38,167
2010 - 40,234
2012 - 40,790

Twin towns – sister cities

Buchholz in der Nordheide is twinned with:
 Canteleu, France
 Järvenpää, Finland
 Wołów, Poland

Notable people
Matthias Wolfes (born 1961), protestant theologian and church historian
Bettina Walter (born 1971), documentary film producer
Alexander Meier (born 1983), footballer
Nikias Arndt (born 1991), cyclist
Anton Stach (born 1998), footballer

Living in Buchholz
Dieter Kottysch (born 1943), boxer, Olympic winner 1972
Christel Wegner (born 1947), politician (DKP, Die Linke), deputy for the Landtag
Wilhelm Leber (born 1947), mathematician, until 2013 Chief Apostle of the New Apostolic Church

References

External links

 

Towns in Lower Saxony
Harburg (district)